The New York slave codes were a series of slave codes passed in the Province of New York to regulate slavery. The first slave code was passed in 1702, with major expansions passing in 1712 and 1730 in response to slave insurrections.

1702 slave code 
The 1702 slave code was a 2-page act with six clauses, which were:

 Preventing free people from trading with any enslaved person without permission of the slave-owner, suffering a fine of five pounds and thrice the value of anything traded.
 Permitting slave-owners to punish their slaves as they see fit, short of maiming or killing them.
 Banning slaves meeting away from the slave-owner's property in groups of three or more.
 Requiring a signed certificate for a slave to be on anyone other than their owner's property.
 Changing the punishment for small crimes committed by slaves so that the slave-owner pays the fine and the slave suffers corporal punishment.
 Banning the testimony of slaves, except against other slaves.

References 

History of slavery in New York (state)
History of racism in New York (state)
African-American history of New York (state)
United States slavery law